Melanie Kay Hutsell (born August 2, 1968) is an American actress, comedian, and writer. Hutsell is best known for her work as a cast member on the NBC sketch comedy series Saturday Night Live from 1991 to 1994.

Life and career
Melanie Hutsell began her career performing improv comedy at the Annoyance Theater in Chicago and starred in its production of The Real Live Brady Bunch in 1990. The comedic stage show consisted of eight actual episodes of the TV show The Brady Bunch, with Hutsell cast as Jan Brady. The company toured to New York City, where Hutsell was hired as a cast member for the 17th season of Saturday Night Live.

Hutsell was a performer on Saturday Night Live, from 1991 to 1993 as featured player, then from 1993 to 1994 as main cast member. While on the show, she reprised her stage portrayal of Jan Brady for a series of Weekend Update and other sketch appearances, making it one of Hutsell's biggest characters while on the show. Other recurring characters included sorority pledge Di in a series of sketches about the sorority girls of Delta Delta Delta, which she starred in alongside fellow castmates Siobhan Fallon and Beth Cahill. Her notable celebrity impressions on SNL included Tori Spelling, Charo, Monica Seles, Tammy Wynette, and Tonya Harding. Hutsell left SNL after three seasons in 1994.

After co-starring in the film Can't Stop Dancing in 1999, Hutsell temporarily left show business to raise her children.

She returned from retirement in 2008, appearing in He's Such a Girl, a 2008 comedy also starring Ed Begley Jr. In May 2009, she appeared as a guest on Best Dishes with Paula Deen on the Food Network, where she appeared in character as Paula Deen's impersonator. She stated that she was making a comeback, focusing on writing. She played the role of Carol in the 2011 comedy hit Bridesmaids. In 2015, Hutsell attended the 40th anniversary special of Saturday Night Live.

From 2015 to 2017, she appeared with recurring roles as Kristen Rhydholm-Rhydholm in the Netflix series Lady Dynamite, and as Jocelyn in the Amazon series Transparent.

She most recently wrote and starred in the comedic drama  Mother's Little Helpers, which premiered at SXSW film festival in 2019.

References

External links
 

1968 births
Living people
People from Maryville, Tennessee
20th-century American actresses
American film actresses
Screenwriters from Tennessee
American impressionists (entertainers)
American musical theatre actresses
American women comedians
American women screenwriters
Actresses from Tennessee
21st-century American actresses
American sketch comedians
20th-century American comedians
21st-century American comedians